Tigran Davtyan (born 10 June 1978) is an Armenian football midfielder. He currently plays for the Armenian Premier League club FC Shirak.

National team history
His debut and last match was an away friendly match against Andorra on 7 June 2002.

Honours
FC Shirak
Armenian Premier League (1): 2012-13
Armenian Cup (3): 2005, 2006, 2011–12
Armenian Supercup (2): 2003, 2006

References

1978 births
Living people
Armenian footballers
Association football midfielders
Armenian Premier League players
FC Shirak players
Armenia international footballers